The 1972 Cotton Bowl Classic was a college football bowl game between the Penn State Nittany Lions and the Texas Longhorns. The 36th Cotton Bowl Classic, it was played on Saturday, January 1, 1972, at the Cotton Bowl in Dallas, Texas.

Background
The Texas Longhorns repeated as Southwest Conference champions and were ranked third in the polls in early October, but consecutive  losses (to rival Oklahoma in the Cotton Bowl and to #15 Arkansas in Little Rock) dropped them to 3–2 and out of national title contention. Texas won its next five games to gain their fourth straight appearance in the Cotton Bowl, all as SWC champion.

The independent Nittany Lions had climbed to 10–0 and fifth in the rankings before the last game of the regular season, a 31–11 upset loss at #12 Tennessee on December 4. (That loss left only Nebraska, Alabama, and Michigan as undefeated, and the first two met for the national title in the Orange Bowl in Miami.) It was Penn State's first Cotton Bowl in 24 years, since 1948.

Game summary
The teams traded field goals and Texas led 6–3 at halftime, but the Nittany Lions scored 27 unanswered points in the second half. Penn State running back Lydell Mitchell and quarterback John Hufnagel had touchdown runs while Hufnagel threw a touchdown pass to Scott Skarzynski. Alberto Vitiello had three field goals for the Lions while Steve Valek kicked two for Texas, their only scoring.

The convincing win pushed Penn State back up to fifth for the final AP poll, while Texas fell to 18th.

Aftermath
The Longhorns went to three more Cotton Bowls in the 1970s, while Penn State returned three years later.

Statistics

References

Cotton Bowl Classic
Cotton Bowl Classic
Penn State Nittany Lions football bowl games
Texas Longhorns football bowl games
January 1972 sports events in the United States
Cotton Bowl